This is a list of films produced in the Spanish Revolution. In the Spanish Revolution, the film industry was collectivized by the CNT and FAI. Between July 1936 and June 1937, 84 films were produced by SIE Films, FRIEP and Spartacus Films. Only about 40 films have been preserved and not all them are complete.

Feature films

Short films

Documentaries

Works about this period 

There are some works that explore this period of Spanish cinema:

 Un cinéma sous influence by Richard Prost
 La cinematografía anarquista en Barcelona durante la Guerra Civil (1936-1939) by Pau Martínez Muñoz

See also 

 Anarchism
 List of films dealing with Anarchism
 List of Spanish films of the 1930s

References

External links 
 Collectivized Creativity: The Rediscovered Films of the CNT
 Cine y Anarquismo 1936: colectivización de la industria cinematográfica 
 Listado de películas conservadas en filmotecas y sus fichas técnicas 

Films about anarchism
Political films
Spanish Revolution of 1936
1930s in Spain
 
Films produced in the Spanish Revolution
1930s political films
1930s politics-related lists